Call2 is an international callback provider, founded in 1997 in the United Kingdom by Peter Farrer and merged by Andrew Try in 1999 to form Comxo Trading Ltd. Their offices are located just outside London, England.

Call2 offers a unique way of initiating long distance and international calls. The system works by receiving a request for a call from the user, via Internet, Phone or SMS, and initiating a callback. This callback dials both the user's number and the person they wish to call, and connects the two calls together. This functionality allows users to avoid the high international call costs imposed by some telephone providers, and even reduce roaming costs. Call2 differs from many other online international call services in that the calls are routed over PSTN lines, not VoIP, and require no additional software or hardware, such as headsets.

History 

1997 - Call2 founded by Peter Farrer.
1999 - Merged with Procall and Latitude to form Comxo Trading Ltd.
2004 - Call2 API launched, allowing integration with 3rd party software.
2005 - Call2 affiliate scheme launched.
2006 - Call2 customer services awarded European (Small) Call Centre of the Year
September 2009 - Call2 Corporate portal launched, with advanced administration and billing tools.
2009 to 2010 - Call2 customer services awarded a gold certificate by the Genesis Group
2010 - Call2 customer services awarded platinum certificate by the Genesis Group
June 2010 - Call2 launches their Microsoft Outlook dialer.
July 2010 - Call2 launches their iPhone app.
October 2010 - Call2 launches the Desktop Dialler - for Windows, Apple and Linux platforms
March 2011 - Call2 launches their BlackBerry app
December 2011 - Call2 selected as "App of the Day" by Mobile Entertainment
January 2012 - Call2 launches their Android App

References 

British websites
Telephony
1997 establishments in England
Technology companies based in London
British companies established in 1997